Thomas Gregory (born 1976) swam the English Channel in 1988 at the age of 11 years and 330 days.  he still holds the record as the youngest person to have done so.

Gregory's coming-of-age story about being the youngest person to swim the Channel, A Boy in the Water (2018,) was joint winner of the 2018 William Hill Sports Book of the Year. It was BBC Radio 4's Book of the Week in August 2018. He served in the Royal Anglian Regiment of the British Army.

References

1976 births
Living people
British male swimmers
English Channel swimmers
World record holders in swimming